Lombardy elected its ninth delegation to the Italian Senate on June 26, 1983. This election was a part of national Italian general election of 1983 even if, according to the Italian Constitution, every senatorial challenge in each Region is a single and independent race.

The election was won by the centrist Christian Democracy, as it happened at national level. Six Lombard provinces gave a majority or at least a plurality to the winning party, while the agricultural Province of Pavia and Province of Mantua, and this time the industrial Province of Milan, preferred the Italian Communist Party.

Background
As the red rising seemed to be stopped in Italy, many center-right electors began to think no more necessary a vote for Christian Democracy which lost many seats to minor parties, especially to the Italian Republican Party of former Prime Minister Giovanni Spadolini.

Electoral system
The electoral system for the Senate was a strange hybrid which established a form of proportional representation into FPTP-like constituencies. A candidate needed a landslide victory of more than 65% of votes to obtain a direct mandate. All constituencies where this result was not reached entered into an at-large calculation based upon the D'Hondt method to distribute the seats between the parties, and candidates with the best percentages of suffrages inside their party list were elected.

Results

|-
|- bgcolor="#E9E9E9"
!rowspan="1" align="left" valign="top"|Party
!rowspan="1" align="center" valign="top"|votes
!rowspan="1" align="center" valign="top"|votes (%)
!rowspan="1" align="center" valign="top"|seats
!rowspan="1" align="center" valign="top"|swing
|-
!align="left" valign="top"|Christian Democracy
|valign="top"|1,747,002
|valign="top"|34.4
|valign="top"|17
|valign="top"|4
|-
!align="left" valign="top"|Italian Communist Party
|valign="top"|1,447,823
|valign="top"|28.5
|valign="top"|15
|valign="top"|=
|-
!align="left" valign="top"|Italian Socialist Party
|valign="top"|615,644
|valign="top"|12.1
|valign="top"|6
|valign="top"|=
|-
!align="left" valign="top"|Italian Republican Party
|valign="top"|349,351
|valign="top"|6.9
|valign="top"|3
|valign="top"|2
|-
!align="left" valign="top"|Italian Social Movement
|valign="top"|255,667
|valign="top"|5.0
|valign="top"|2
|valign="top"|1
|-
!align="left" valign="top"|Italian Liberal Party
|valign="top"|197,084
|valign="top"|3.9
|valign="top"|2
|valign="top"|1
|-
!align="left" valign="top"|Italian Democratic Socialist Party
|valign="top"|192,172
|valign="top"|3.8
|valign="top"|2
|valign="top"|=
|-
!align="left" valign="top"|Radical Party
|valign="top"|103,697
|valign="top"|2.0
|valign="top"|1
|valign="top"|=
|-
!align="left" valign="top"|Others
|valign="top"|168,885
|valign="top"|3.3
|valign="top"|-
|valign="top"|=
|- bgcolor="#E9E9E9"
!rowspan="1" align="left" valign="top"|Total parties
!rowspan="1" align="right" valign="top"|5,076,325
!rowspan="1" align="right" valign="top"|100.0
!rowspan="1" align="right" valign="top"|48
!rowspan="1" align="right" valign="top"|=
|}

Sources: Italian Ministry of the Interior

Constituencies

|-
|- bgcolor="#E9E9E9"
!align="left" valign="top"|N°
!align="center" valign="top"|Constituency
!align="center" valign="top"|Elected
!align="center" valign="top"|Party
!align="center" valign="top"|Votes %
!align="center" valign="top"|Others
|-
|align="left"|1
|align="left"|Bergamo
|align="left"|Angelo Castelli
|align="left"|Christian Democracy
|align="left"|49.6%
|align="left"|
|-
|align="left"|2
|align="left"|Clusone
|align="left"|Enzo Berlanda
|align="left"|Christian Democracy
|align="left"|55.8%
|align="left"|
|-
|align="left"|3
|align="left"|Treviglio
|align="left"|Vincenzo Bombardieri
|align="left"|Christian Democracy
|align="left"|49.6%
|align="left"|
|-
|align="left"|4
|align="left"|Brescia
|align="left"|Pietro PadulaGino Torri
|align="left"|Christian DemocracyItalian Communist Party
|align="left"|37.5%28.5%
|align="left"|
|-
|align="left"|5
|align="left"|Breno
|align="left"|Franco Salvi
|align="left"|Christian Democracy
|align="left"|48.4%
|align="left"|
|-
|align="left"|6
|align="left"|Chiari
|align="left"|Giovanni Prandini
|align="left"|Christian Democracy
|align="left"|49.3%
|align="left"|
|-
|align="left"|7
|align="left"|Salò
|align="left"|Elio Fontana
|align="left"|Christian Democracy
|align="left"|42.2%
|align="left"|Italo Nicoletto (PCI) 26.2%
|-
|align="left"|8
|align="left"|Como
|align="left"|Gianfranco AlivertiGianfranco Conti Persini
|align="left"|Christian DemocracyItalian Democratic Socialist Party
|align="left"|35.7%7.5%
|align="left"|
|-
|align="left"|9
|align="left"|Lecco
|align="left"|Maria Paola ColomboPietro Fiocchi
|align="left"|Christian DemocracyItalian Liberal Party
|align="left"|41.4%9.0%
|align="left"|
|-
|align="left"|10
|align="left"|Cantù
|align="left"|Vittorino Colombo
|align="left"|Christian Democracy
|align="left"|41.6%
|align="left"|
|-
|align="left"|11
|align="left"|Cremona
|align="left"|Renzo AntoniazziVincenzo Vernaschi
|align="left"|Italian Communist PartyChristian Democracy
|align="left"|35.9%34.7%
|align="left"|
|-
|align="left"|12
|align="left"|Crema
|align="left"|Francesco RebecchiniUnconstitutional result 
|align="left"|Christian Democracy
|align="left"|42.6%28.1%
|align="left"|Maurizio Noci (PSI) 13.6%seat ceded to Pintus
|-
|align="left"|13
|align="left"|Mantua
|align="left"|Giuseppe ChiaranteGino Scevarolli
|align="left"|Italian Communist PartyItalian Socialist Party
|align="left"|34.6%14.6%
|align="left"|
|-
|align="left"|14
|align="left"|Ostiglia
|align="left"|Maurizio LottiEnrico Novellini
|align="left"|Italian Communist PartyItalian Socialist Party
|align="left"|42.5%16.7%
|align="left"|
|-
|align="left"|15
|align="left"|Milan 1
|align="left"|Guido Carli^Giovanni SpadoliniGiovanni Malagodi
|align="left"|Christian DemocracyItalian Republican PartyItalian Liberal Party
|align="left"|28.2%20.6%9.9%
|align="left"|
|-
|align="left"|16
|align="left"|Milan 2
|align="left"|Giorgio PisanòSpadolini's third election
|align="left"|Italian Social Movement
|align="left"|9.2%18%
|align="left"| seat ceded to Ferrara
|-
|align="left"|17
|align="left"|Milan 3
|align="left"|Giorgio CoviCesare BigliaMario Signorino
|align="left"|Italian Republican PartyItalian Social MovementRadical Party
|align="left"|14.2%8.5%3.2%
|align="left"|
|-
|align="left"|18
|align="left"|Milan 4
|align="left"|Roberto Romei^Spadolini's second election
|align="left"|Christian Democracy
|align="left"|23.5%19%
|align="left"| seat ceded to Covi
|-
|align="left"|19
|align="left"|Milan 5
|align="left"|Giuliano ProcacciGiovanni Ferrara
|align="left"|Italian Communist PartyItalian Republican Party
|align="left"|30.6%11.1%
|align="left"|
|-
|align="left"|20
|align="left"|Milan 6
|align="left"|Eliseo Milani
|align="left"|Italian Communist Party
|align="left"|32.3%
|align="left"|
|-
|align="left"|21
|align="left"|Abbiategrasso
|align="left"|Massimo Riva
|align="left"|Italian Communist Party (Gsi)
|align="left"|34.3%
|align="left"|
|-
|align="left"|22
|align="left"|Rho
|align="left"|Rodolfo Bollini
|align="left"|Italian Communist Party
|align="left"|36.2%
|align="left"|
|-
|align="left"|23
|align="left"|Monza
|align="left"|Libero Riccardelli
|align="left"|Italian Communist Party
|align="left"|30.9%
|align="left"|Felice Calcaterra (DC) 32.9%
|-
|align="left"|24
|align="left"|Vimercate
|align="left"|Luigi GranelliMarina Rossanda
|align="left"|Christian DemocracyItalian Communist Party
|align="left"|35.6%31.0%
|align="left"|
|-
|align="left"|25
|align="left"|Lodi
|align="left"|Antonio TaramelliAlfredo Diana
|align="left"|Italian Communist PartyChristian Democracy
|align="left"|37.3%34.4%
|align="left"|
|-
|align="left"|26
|align="left"|Pavia
|align="left"|Armelino MilaniRenato Garibaldi
|align="left"|Italian Communist Party (Gsi)Italian Socialist Party
|align="left"|35.6%14.3%
|align="left"|
|-
|align="left"|27
|align="left"|Voghera
|align="left"|Luigi MeriggiLuigi PanigazziRenzo Sclavi
|align="left"|Italian Communist PartyItalian Socialist PartyItalian Democratic Socialist Party
|align="left"|31.7%15.2%6.0%
|align="left"|
|-
|align="left"|28
|align="left"|Vigevano
|align="left"|Armando Cossutta
|align="left"|Italian Communist Party
|align="left"|41.6%
|align="left"|
|-
|align="left"|29
|align="left"|Sondrio
|align="left"|Eugenio TarabiniLibero Della Briotta
|align="left"|Christian DemocracyItalian Socialist Party
|align="left"|48.6%17.4%
|align="left"|
|-
|align="left"|30
|align="left"|Varese
|align="left"|Francesco Pintus
|align="left"|Italian Communist Party (Gsi)
|align="left"|27.2%
|align="left"|
|-
|align="left"|31
|align="left"|Busto Arsizio 
|align="left"|Andrea Buffoni
|align="left"|Italian Socialist Party
|align="left"|13.8%
|align="left"|Gian Pietro Rossi (DC) 34.1%
|}

Substitutions
Maurizio Noci for Crema (13.6%) replaced Libero Della Briotta in 1985. Reason: death.
Gian Pietro Rossi for Busto Arsizio (34.1%) replaced Pietro Padula in 1986. Reason: resignation.
Felice Calcaterra for Monza (32.9%) replaced Gian Pietro Rossi in 1986. Reason: resignation.
Italo Nicoletto for Salò (26.2%) replaced Giuliano Procacci in 1986. Reason: resignation.

Notes

Elections in Lombardy
1983 elections in Italy